On November 3, 2020, the District of Columbia held a U.S. House of Representatives election for its shadow representative. Unlike its non-voting delegate, the shadow representative is only recognized by the district and is not officially sworn or seated.

ANC Commissioner Oye Owolewa won the election to replace retiring three-term incumbent shadow representative Franklin Garcia.

Primary elections

Democratic primary

Candidates

Declared
 Oye Owolewa, ANC commissioner for 8E and pharmacist

Declined
 Franklin Garcia, incumbent shadow representative and president of the DC Latino Leadership Council

Results
Owolewa received over 90% of the vote in every ward.

Republican primary

Statehood Green primary

Libertarian primary

General election
The general election took place on November 3, 2020.

Candidates
 Oye Owolewa (Democratic)
 Sohaer Rizvi Syed (Independent)
 Joyce Robinson-Paul (D.C. Statehood Green)

Results

References

External links

Official campaign websites
 Oye Owolewa (D) for Congress
 Sohaer Syed (I) for Congress

Washington, D.C., Shadow Representative elections
United States Shadow Representative